Cally Kwong Mei-wan (born 24 December 1962) is a Hong Kong singer.

Early life

Kwong was born Cally Kwong Mei Wan on 24 December 1962 in British Hong Kong. Her family was poor and her mother died when she was 14.

Career
Cally entered into the Miss Hong Kong contest organised by HK TVB in 1982 when she was 19 and won the 1st runner-up title. The Miss Hong Kong of this year was Anglie Leon Leung and the 2nd runner-up was Isabella Kau. As the 1st runner-up, Cally represented Hong Kong in the 32nd edition of Miss World 1982 contest. Her contestant number was 29 out of 68. The event was held on 18 November 1982 at the Royal Albert Hall in London, UK.

She later became a cantopop singer. In 1984, she signed up to PolyGram Records and released her first solo album a year later. She later became the Cantonese Singing voice for Ariel.

She started jewelry studies and obtained a diploma in gemology and in 2000, she opened her own store, Cally Jewellery.

Political career
Cally started her charity work back in early 1990s. Because of her contribution to Jiangxi province, she was elected as delegate to the 9th and 10th Jiangxi CPPCC: The Chinese People's Political Consultative Conference.
Cally was elected as one of the 36 delegates representing Hong Kong to the China National People's Congress in Dec 2017.

Personal life
In 1996, Kwong married actor Ray Lui Leung-wai, however the marriage only lasted 18-months.

In 2000, Kwong became a Buddhist and joined the Fo Guang Shan (Mountain of Buddhist Light)whose headquarters is near Kaohsiung in the south of Taiwan. Since then, she adopted her religious principles in her investment.

From 2000, Cally started to donate in China, mostly in Jiangxi province in building primary and secondary schools for the poor. Her goal was to build 100 schools. In 2008, she was named one of the top 10 philanthropists in Jiangxi.

See also
Miss Hong Kong Pageant

References

1962 births
Living people
20th-century Hong Kong women singers
Cantopop singers
Delegates to the 13th National People's Congress from Hong Kong
Delegates to the 14th National People's Congress from Hong Kong
Hong Kong Mandopop singers